Martin Harvey Krieger (born March 10, 1944 in Brooklyn, New York) is an American physicist, author, and emeritus professor with decades of teaching in public policy and urban planning. He is known for his research on mathematical models of urban phenomena, ecological issues of design and planning, notions of uncertainty in policy and planning, environmental policy, defense policy, and aural and visual documentation of urban phenomena in southern California, especially Los Angeles.

Education and career
Martin H. Krieger was brought up as an Orthodox Jew in Bensonhurst, Brooklyn. At Columbia University he graduated in physics with a B.A. magna cum laude in 1965, an M.A. in 1965, and a Ph.D. in 1969. His Ph.D. thesis is entitled Neutron Emission from Muon Capture.

From 1968 to 1973 Krieger worked at the University of California, Berkeley — from 1968 to 1969 as a physicist at the Lawrence Radiation Laboratory, from 1969 to 1972 as an assistant research planner at the Institute of Urban and Regional Development (IURD, established in 1962), and from 1970 to 1973 at the UC Berkeley College of Environmental Design as a lecturer in environmental policy, in city and regional planning, and in architecture. From 1973 to 1974 he was a fellow at the Center for Advanced Study in the Behavioral Sciences adjacent to Stanford University. From 1974 to 1980 (with leave of absence from 1978 to 1980) he was an assistant professor at the University of Minnesota's Hubert H. Humphrey Institute of Public Affairs. From 1978 to 1979 he was a fellow at the National Humanities Center in North Carolina. From 1980 to 1984 he taught and did research at the Massachusetts Institute of Technology (MIT), in the Program in Science, Technology, and Society and in the Department of Urban Studies and Planning. At the University of Southern California (USC) he was an associate professor of planning from 1984 to 1991 and a full professor from 1991 until his retirement as professor emeritus. For the academic year 1990–1991 he was on leave of absence from USC and held a visiting associate professorship in business administration at the University of Michigan, as the Zell-Lurie Fellow in the Teaching of Entrepreneurship. He received many fellowships and grants for   his research and contributed to numerous photographic exhibits. He is the author of ten books.

From about 1998 to 2019, Krieger systematically photographed, among other topics: storefront houses of worship in Los Angeles (750+); all the Los Angeles Department of Water and Power electrical substations (125); the Orthodox Jewish enclave Pico-Robertson; industrial streetscapes in Los Angeles and then industrial worksites in Los Angeles (225), showing people at work; sellers at swap meets in Los Angeles, as entrepreneurs; “transit oriented development” in neighborhoods surrounding New York City Subway Stations (75), and a similar but more limited project internationally, at first in Barcelona and Singapore (project ceased due to 2020 quarantine).

In another project, Krieger and collaborators rephotographed Paris scenes that were originally photographed by Charles Marville (1813–1879), before and after photographs as Paris was reconstructed under Baron Haussmann and Napoleon III.

In the latter part of this period, Krieger recorded in calibrated and accurate surround sound: people talking on the bus in Los Angeles; the ambience in various sites in Los Angeles; worship services at  storefront houses of worship, among other projects.

The visual and aural research was supported by grants from the John Randolph Haynes and Dora Haynes Foundation. Much of the photographic material is archived at calisphere.org under “Martin Krieger Collection.”

Krieger received the USC-Mellon Award for Excellence in Mentoring three times: in 2005, in 2006, and in 2007, for mentoring, respectively, undergraduates, faculty, and graduate students. In 2006 he was elected a fellow of the American Physical Society for "his series of books on the historical development of models and the mathematics employed in twentieth-century physics, especially the Ising model and its relatives and the proofs of the stability of matter."

Selected publications

Articles
 
 
 
 
 
 
 
 
 
 
  (over 350 citations)

Books
 ; xiv + 241 pp.
 ; xxiii + 182 pp.
 ; xxii + 343 pp. 
 
 
 
 ; xxi + 157 pp.
 ; xviii + 454 pp.  According to John H. Mason of the Open University, in “Review of Doing Mathematics,” Math-Sci Net, MR1961400 (2004a:00011) “Not since conversations with Gian-Carlo Rota have I encountered such a sophisticated and comprehensive view of modern mathematics.”
 ; xxiv + 467 pp.
 ; xviii + 130 pp. hbk 
 ; xx + 168 pp.
 ; xxvi + 218 pp.
 ; xxxi + 380pp. e-book

References

External links
 
 
 
 
  (research at USC; Martin Krieger with Greg Hise)
 
 

1944 births
Living people
20th-century American physicists
21st-century American physicists
20th-century American writers
21st-century American writers
Applied mathematicians
American urban planners
Columbia Graduate School of Arts and Sciences alumni
University of Southern California faculty
Fellows of the American Physical Society